Malinaltepec is one of the 81 municipalities of Guerrero, in south-western Mexico. The municipal seat lies at Malinaltepec.  The municipality covers an area of 492 km².

As of 2005, the municipality had a total population of 26,613.

References

Municipalities of Guerrero